Andrea Chiuchich (born 24 April 1969) is an Argentine fencer. She competed in the women's individual foil event at the 1992 Summer Olympics.

References

External links
 

1969 births
Living people
Argentine female foil fencers
Olympic fencers of Argentina
Fencers at the 1992 Summer Olympics
Fencers at the 2011 Pan American Games
Pan American Games medalists in fencing
Pan American Games bronze medalists for Argentina
20th-century Argentine women